is a Japanese former professional boxer who competed from 1999 to 2016. He is the first Japanese boxer to win world titles in three weight classes, having held the WBC bantamweight title from 2005 to 2010; the WBC featherweight title from 2010 to 2011; and the WBC super-bantamweight title in 2016. Hasegawa received MVP awards from the Japan Boxing Commission in 2005, 2006, 2008, and 2009 for his title defenses, and is the first Japanese boxer to have defended a bantamweight world title more four times. He is Matsuzaka Generation.

Professional career 
Born as the second of five children in Nishiwaki, Hyōgo, Hasegawa made his professional debut in 1999. Despite losing two four-round fights by decision early in his career, he defeated Jesse Maca by 12-round decision in 2003 to win the OPBF bantamweight title, which he defended three times before returning the belt on December 20, 2004.

Bantamweight
Hasegawa fought long-time champion Veeraphol Sahaprom on April 16, 2005, at Nippon Budokan. Sahaprom had defended the WBC bantamweight title against ten contenders over six years, and had not been defeated for almost a decade. Hasegawa fought effectively, leading the first four rounds, before Sahaprom fought back to win the middle rounds. Sahaprom tired in the later rounds, allowing Hasegawa to become more aggressive, shaking Sahaprom in round 10. The fight went to a decision, and the judges gave Hasegawa a 3–0 victory, ending Sahaprom's long reign over the bantamweight division.

Hasegawa made his first title defense on September 25, 2005, at Yokohama Arena. Hasegawa was originally scheduled to fight WBC top-ranked contender Diego Morales. However, Morales backed out of the fight due to an injury, and the eighth-ranked contender, Geraldo Martinez, was hastily called up as a substitute. Hasegawa had been sparring with southpaws in preparation to fight Morales, who was a southpaw, but the change to Martinez meant he would now be fighting an orthodox style fighter. Hasegawa took an early lead in the fight, knocking Martinez down twice in the 2nd round (ruled as slips by the referee), and once in the 3rd round. Hasegawa put Martinez down again early in the 7th with a dazzling left straight, and the fight erupted into a massive slugfest between the two fighters. Hasegawa knocked Martinez down two more times in the same round, prompting the referee to stop the fight. Hasegawa marked his first title defense with a TKO victory. This was also the day of his wedding anniversary.

On March 25, 2006, Hasegawa returned to fight in his hometown, Kobe, for the first time after becoming world champion. Hasegawa's opponent for his second title defense was again Veeraphol Sahaprom, who had compiled five consecutive wins to become the top-ranked WBC contender after losing his title to Hasegawa a year ago. It was rumored that Sahaprom had not been in top condition when he lost to Hasegawa, and many speculated that Sahaprom had not fought to the best of his ability in the previous fight. Both fighters started off slowly, but Hasegawa's shots gradually began to land on Sahaprom, and almost knocked out Sahaprom with a powerful left uppercut in the 6th. Sahaprom fought back in the 7th and 8th rounds, landing body shots, but Hasegawa landed a stunning right hook only ten seconds into the 9th round to knock out Sahaprom. Since Hasegawa suffered a left sternal fracture in June 2006, the scheduled defense on July 15 was postponed.

The third title defense took place on November 13, 2006, at Nippon Budokan, where Hasegawa first won the title. The challenger was Mexican fighter Genaro Garcia, ranked 1st in the WBC. Hasegawa knocked Garcia down with a left uppercut in the 4th round, but Garcia showed surprising resilience, landing powerful body shots in the middle rounds. Hasegawa suffered a light cut in the 7th round, which was worsened by a head-butt from Garcia in the 8th. Hasegawa managed to knock down Garcia again in the 8th, though his own face was covered with blood, and his eye was practically sealed shut from the cut. Hasegawa showed able defensive skills to ride out the 12th round, and won with a unanimous 3-0 decision. After the fight, Hasegawa was visited by WBC super-flyweight Champion Masamori Tokuyama, who gave Hasegawa a hand-written letter challenging him for his bantamweight title. If the fight with Tokuyama had taken place, it would have been a huge match-up between two Japan-based world champions, but Hasegawa declined the offer, wanting to fight non-Japanese challengers instead. Tokuyama retired shortly afterwards.

Hasegawa fought undefeated challenger Simpiwe Vetyeka of South Africa on May 3, 2007, for the fourth defense of his title. Very little was known about the challenger, Vetyeka, except that he had an undefeated record (16-0-0), and had defended the South African bantamweight title five times, winning four of those fights by knockout. He was also said to have compiled an exceptional career in the amateur ring. The fight itself was rather anticlimactic, as there had been huge excitement about the May 3 card, which featured two other world title match-ups. Both Hasegawa and Vetyeka wanted to land counter punches, leading to a great deal of inactivity from both sides. Neither fighter seemed willing to expose themselves, and few hard punches were thrown in the early rounds of the fight. The open scoring system was used in the fight, and Hasegawa was leading in the judges' scorecards going into the later rounds, but Vetyeka continued to lie back and wait for Hasegawa to attack. Hasegawa finally stepped up to decisively win the final two rounds, and won his fourth defense with a unanimous decision. There was some frustration after the fight, because both Hasegawa and Vetyeka complained that one of the advertisements in the middle of the ring was causing their feet to slip. This was the first world title defense where Hasegawa was unable to knock down his opponent in the fight.

Hasegawa defended his title for the fifth time on January 10, 2008, with a 12-round unanimous decision victory against top-ranked WBC contender Simone Maludrottu. Hasegawa had transferred to the newly established Shinsei Boxing Gym in Kobe along with its founder and his trainer, Masato Yamashita, during the 8-month layoff since his last defense. Despite suffering a cut above his right eye early in the fight, Hasegawa dominated the fight to win by unanimous decision. This made him the first Japanese boxer to have defended a bantamweight world title over four times.

He defended it again for the sixth time, defeating Venezuela's Cristian Faccio with a second-round TKO on June 12, 2008.

Hasegawa fought on October 16, 2008, when he defended his title for the 7th time by taking on Mexican prospect Alejandro Valdez. Hasegawa won the fight by technical knockout in the second round.

His eighth title defense was a lot more impressive as he stopped Vusi Malinga in a single round on March 12, 2009.

He defended it again for the ninth time, defeating USA's Nestor Rocha with a first-round TKO on July 14, 2009.

He defended his title for the tenth time by knocking out Alvaro Perez on December 12, 2009.

End of title run
On April 30, 2010, Hasegawa challenged WBO 118-pound champion Fernando Montiel of Mexico. Although Montiel holds a title in the same division, it was not on the line because of JBC policy. At the bout, Hasegawa won the first three rounds, frustrating the Mexican visitor. In the fourth round Montiel landed an attack on Hasegawa, leaving the hometown fighter vulnerable for more blows. The referee declared an end and this was Hasegawa's first knockout loss. Aside from losing the match and the title, Hasegawa also suffered a shattered jaw. The injury was caused not by Montiel's barrage of attacks in the 4th round but by an impact Hasegawa took in the first round.

Featherweight
Following the bout with Montiel, Hasegawa went up two weight divisions and fight Juan Carlos Burgos for the vacant WBC featherweight crown on November 26, 2010 and won the WBC Featherweight Championship.
 Hasegawa was nominated as return of the year for the Best of 2010 awards by WBC, but was granted the most dramatic fight of the year for the match against Fernando Montiel, after all.

After being dethroned by Jhonny González in April 2011, Hasegawa hired a new trainer Frankie Liles in November 2011, in addition to his long-time trainer Yamashita, and has intensely trained with them.

Hasegawa was slated to make his return to the ring against the undefeated Mexican featherweight Carlos Felipe Felix on December 17, 2011. 
However, a broken right rib that he sustained during training caused the bout to be postponed until April 6, 2012. He stopped the opponent in the seventh round in that comeback appearance.

Super-bantamweight
In October 2012, it was announced that Hasegawa would move down a weight division to super-bantamweight in his next fight in December. He defeated Arturo Santos Reyes via a unanimous decision in Kobe on December 22, 2012. Hasegawa told that he had needed two years after winning the featherweight title to recapture his early style. He had suffered from lack of motivation to continue fighting during the two years after the death of his dearest mother and the tragedy of the aftermath of the 2011 Tōhoku earthquake and tsunami that struck Japan.

Hasegawa faced Genaro Camargo in a bout in Tokyo on August 12, 2013. He won by TKO in the first round.

Hasegawa fought for the IBF super-bantamweight title against reigning champion Kiko Martinez on April 23, 2014 in Osaka. In what many thought to be the last fight in the colorful career of Hasegawa, a back and forth contest erupted, with the Spaniard's one punch knockout power being the deciding factor as he urged a referee stoppage in 7th round following a brutal attack on his Japanese foe.

Following the Martinez bout, there were calls by many for Hasegawa to retire, as it seemed he was no longer the fighter he once was. However, Hasegawa returned to the ring on May 9, 2015 in Kobe against undefeated Mexican Horacio Garcia. He won the fight comfortably via UD over 10 rounds.

On September 15, 2016, Hasegawa defeated Hugo Ruiz by technical knockout to become WBC super-bantamweight champion. Later that year, on December 9, Hasegawa announced his retirement from boxing.

Professional boxing record

See also 
List of boxing triple champions
List of WBC world champions
List of Japanese boxing world champions
Boxing in Japan

References

External links 

Hozumi Hasegawa article at ESPN

1980 births
Living people
Sportspeople from Hyōgo Prefecture
Southpaw boxers
World Boxing Council champions
World bantamweight boxing champions
World boxing champions
Japanese male boxers
Boxing commentators
World featherweight boxing champions
World super-bantamweight boxing champions